Forda marginata is a species of aphid. It is a pest of millets. It has been recorded on barnyard grass, Elymus sp., Hordeum spp., Setaria spp., wheat, and oats in the United States.

References

Eriosomatinae
Insect pests of millets